A. Y. Jackson Secondary School is a community high school in the Glen Cairn neighbourhood of Kanata, a suburb in the west end of Ottawa, Ontario, Canada. It is part of the Ottawa-Carleton District School Board and was first opened in 1976. The school was named after A. Y. Jackson, the famous Canadian painter, and one of the founders of the Group of Seven.

AYJ had approximately 700 students attending its program in 2020–2021. The majority of students come from W.O. Mitchell Elementary School, Glen Cairn Public School, and Katimavik Elementary School, its four associate schools.

International Programme
In 2006, AYJ became the first school internationally to be recognized as a Global Learning Centre by the International School Connection. This designation is a reflection of the emphasis placed on international learning and global citizenship.

The school runs two major international exchanges each year with partner schools in Zaragoza, Spain and Suzhou, China.  As well, each year there are trips to destinations in the United States as well as other international trips such as a tour of the Canadian battlefields of Europe, a trip to Thailand and concert band tours of Italy and Austria.

The school has hosted a Beyond Our Walls Conference where students from across Ottawa came to learn about opportunities to volunteer in their communities and around the world. This conference has since been stopped. AYJ formed a major partnership with the Lwak Girls' High School in the Rarieda area of Kenya, to provide fundraising for the Kenyan school as well as creating  collaborations between the students in both countries.  In 2009, AYJ hosted a Run for Kenya fundraising run.  Several elite Kenyan long-distance runners visited AYJ to show their support.

Science and technology
AYJ had an in-house closed-circuit television station known as JTV, that produces a daily news and information program, replacing the traditional audio announcements via the Public Address system. As of 2015, this has been replaced via a YouTube channel. It began being offered as a technology credit course in 2004 and the station earned several students the 2005 OCRI High School IT Entrepreneur of The Year Award.

AYJ was the first school in Ottawa to participate in the Engineers in Schools program allowing students to talk with local engineers.

Arts

Drama
On the evening of Oct. 20, 2009, AYJ drama teacher Illona Henkelman and the cast of A Few Good Men were received awards at the Arts Advisory Committee Awards Ceremony. Mrs. Henkelman won the Secondary School Drama Teacher of the Year (2008–2009) award and the AYJ play A Few Good Men won an award for 'Outstanding Event of the Year'. In 2010, their production of "Sweeney Todd: The Demon Barber of Fleet Street" won in the Critic's Favourite Musical category at the annual Cappies Gala and, in 2011, they won the Critic's Favourite Play category with the Canada's Capital Cappies for their production of Neil Simon's "Plaza Suite".

The Drama and Music Department co-produced "The Addams Family Musical". This production was directed by drama teacher Illona Henkleman with music teacher Jessica Sullivan conducting the pit band. They won multiple awards at the Cappies in June, including the award for Best Musical.

Music
In February 2015, the AYJ Senior Band competed in the Capital Region Music Festival, a regional qualifying competition for MusicFest Canada. For the first time in the school's history, the band was awarded the Gold Standard for their performance.

Athletics
The school has achieved city National Capital Secondary School Athletic Association championships for the Varsity lacrosse (2015, 2016, 2018 & 2019) and junior boys rugby program. Senior Boys Volleyball won city championships in 1986, 1988, 1995, 2001, and 2002 as well as three Western Conference Championships in 2003, 2004, and 2020. The Junior Boys Basketball won three Western Conference titles (2003, 2005, 2006). The Blue Jays also won city championships for boys baseball in 2005, 2011, and 2014. The AYJ Badimation Club won championships in 1983, 1985, 1986, 1997, 1998, 2005, and 2010. In 2008, the senior boys' basketball team won the provincial OFSAA AA championship, the first Ottawa high school to win a provincial basketball championship in 59 years. In 2020, AYJ won a Tier 2 Girls Hockey Championship. In 2009, the varsity boys non-contact hockey team won the city championship. The Snowboard & Ski Club is the largest club at the school with regular multi-day excursions during the winter months to Le Massif and Mont-Sainte-Anne, as well as single-day trips to Mont-Tremblant.

Controversy
In late 2011 a student at A. Y. Jackson, Jamie Hubley (son of Allan Hubley) committed suicide due to bullying.  According to a news report at the time, the student was the “only openly gay student at the school,” and was bullied as a result. Hubley described in his final blog post being called "fag" in the hallways. His father stated that posters promoting an "anti-discrimination Rainbow Club" at school were torn down and Jamie was bullied in the hallways. Calls for stronger programs led to the establishment of an anti-bullying initiative, announced at A. Y. Jackson, and launched by the Canadian Red Cross in the wake of his suicide.

Notable alumni
 Jim Bryson - musician

See also
List of high schools in Ontario

References

External links

 
 District site

High schools in Ottawa
Educational institutions established in 1976
1976 establishments in Ontario